Milorad Rajović (13 May 1955 – 12 January 2016) was a Serbian footballer.

Career
Rajović began his career with his home town club FK Crvenka. He also played for NK Marsonia before becoming a professional with FK Dinamo Vinkovici in the Yugoslav First League. He went abroad in 1986, joining Apollon Athens F.C. in the Greek Super League.

Personal life
His son is Zoran Rajović.

References

1955 births
2016 deaths
People from Crvenka
Serbian footballers
Association football forwards
FK Crvenka players
NK Marsonia players
HNK Cibalia players
Yugoslav First League players
Apollon Smyrnis F.C. players
Expatriate footballers in Greece